Birds of Prey is the second album led by cellist Hank Roberts which was recorded in 1990 and released on the JMT label.

Reception

The AllMusic review by Michael G. Nastos says, "The music is progressive at times and too commercial at others. His best work lies ahead". The Los Angeles Times''' Don Snowden noted "This CD could easily be a mutant mess if not for female vocalist D.K. Dyson, a shining beacon. Roberts doesn't hog the spotlight and his compositions ably negotiate juxtapositions which are often jarring but rarely forced".

Track listingAll compositions by Hank Roberts''
 "Comin' Home" - 6:35  
 "Pretty Boy Tom" - 7:44  
 "Seven Generations" - 7:16  
 "Angels and Mud" - 4:27  
 "Scream" - 2:02  
 "Touch" - 8:15  
 "Hear Me" - 7:23

Personnel
Hank Roberts - cello, vocals
Mark Lampariello - guitar, vocals
Jerome Harris - bass, vocals
Vinnie Johnson - drums, vocals
D.K. Dyson - vocals

References 

1990 albums
Hank Roberts albums
JMT Records albums
Winter & Winter Records albums